Volkman is a surname. Notable people with the surname include:

 Aja Volkman (born 1981), American musician
 Alisa Volkman (fl. 2000s), American online magazine co-founder (see Babble.com)
 Ed Volkman (fl. 2000s), American radio personality (see Eddie & JoBo)
 Eric Volkman (fl. 2000s), Czech financial magazine publisher (see Finance New Europe)
 Ernest Volkman (born 1940), American journalist, author
 Harry Volkman (1926–2015), American meteorologist
 Karen Volkman (born 1967), American poet
 Kyle Volkman (fl. 2000s), American musician (see Shook Twins)

See also
Volkmann